The "Anthem of Krajna" is a song whose lyrics were written by Paweł Jasiek. It is used by the inhabitants of Krajna, Poland as an unofficial anthem.

The song was composed in the 1930s. The lyrics were written by Paweł Jasiek on August 25, 1932, in Olsztyn, having just returned from a visit to his hometown of Zakrzewo. Music was written roughly at the same time as the lyrics. In 1975 a citizen of Łódź, Professor Bernard Pietrzak, worked out an arrangement for a four-person mixed choir. The anthem of Krajna is also used by the Ziemia Krajeńska Elementary School in Samsieczno as the school anthem.

Lyrics of the anthem

References

External links
About the anthem on the website of Kamień Krajeński Commune Office

Polish songs
Polish patriotic songs